The Republic of China (Taiwan) joined APEC in 1991 together with Mainland China and British Hong Kong.

The heads of government of all Asia-Pacific Economic Cooperation Member Economies meet annually in a summit called "APEC Economic Leaders' Meeting" rotating in location among APEC's Member Economies. However, due to the nature of the Economic Forum of APEC and One China Policy, the President of the Republic of China is not allowed to appear in APEC and President of the Republic of China appoints a special envoy every year to attend APEC Meeting under the name Chinese Taipei.

Galleries

Notes
  Leadership in semi-governmental organizations are classified here as "official offices."
  President Chen Shui-bian had appointed former Vice President Li Yuan-zu as his envoy, but the PRC, which was hosting the summit, objected to his choice and the Chinese Taipei delegation decided to boycott.
  President Chen's original choice of Legislative Yuan President Wang Jin-pyng was rejected by the host South Korea. Chen also applied to attend personally but was denied his request.
  President Chen's original choice of former Vice Premier Tsai Ing-wen was rejected by Australia because of her alleged involvement in formulating the "One Country on Each Side" theory.

See also
 Asia-Pacific Economic Cooperation
 Chinese Taipei

References

External links
Leader's Declarations – Asia-Pacific Economic Cooperation
Who's Who in Taiwan 2004

Asia-Pacific Economic Cooperation
APEC
APEC